Keezharoor  is a village in Thiruvananthapuram district in the state of Kerala, India.

Demographics
 India census, Keezharoor had a population of 23595 with 11598 males and 11997 females.

References

Villages in Thiruvananthapuram district